Tourtour is a commune in the Var department in the Provence-Alpes-Côte d'Azur region in southeastern France. It is a member of Les Plus Beaux Villages de France ("The most beautiful villages of France") association.

Geography
Called "the village in the sky of Provence" (le village dans le ciel de Provence), Tourtour overlooks a large part of Provence from the town of Fréjus along the Mediterranean coast in the east to the Montagne Sainte-Victoire, a favorite subject of the painter Paul Cézanne, in the west.

In popular culture
The Bastide de Tourtour, a local hotel, was prominently featured in the film Day of the Jackal  and the 2010 ITV series "Monte Carlo or bust".

Sister cities
 Portaria, Greece

Gallery

See also
Communes of the Var department

References

External links

 Village de Tourtour
   Pictures Tourtour

Communes of Var (department)
Plus Beaux Villages de France